Gassino Torinese is a comune (municipality) in the Metropolitan City of Turin in the Italian region Piedmont, located about  northeast of Turin.

Gassino Torinese borders the following municipalities: Settimo Torinese, San Raffaele Cimena, Rivalba, Castiglione Torinese, Sciolze, Pavarolo, Montaldo Torinese.

References

External links
 Official website